Joe Daniher (born 4 March 1994) is an Australian rules footballer with the Brisbane Lions in the Australian Football League (AFL). He previously played for the Essendon Football Club from 2013 to 2020, having been recruited to the club under the father–son rule. Daniher won a Crichton Medal and All-Australian selection in 2017, as well as the 2017 AFL Mark of the Year and Anzac Medal for that season. He is also a four-time Essendon leading goalkicker.

Early life and football career
Daniher is the son of a former AFL fullback, Anthony Daniher, who played 115 games for the Sydney Swans and 118 games for Essendon.

Daniher played for the Calder Cannons in the TAC Cup, he was named All-Australian in the AFL Under 18 Championships playing for Vic Metro and is a graduate of the Australian Institute of Sport's AFL Academy.

AFL career

Essendon (2013–20)
Daniher was drafted by  under the father-son rule, with the tenth overall selection in the 2012 national draft. He made his debut against  in round 11, 2013. In his second game (round 12 against ), he was named among the best players, kicking his first AFL goal and scoring a total of three goals in the match.

He showed positive progression in his second season, leading the club in goal kicking with 28 for the season including 4 goals against North Melbourne in an Elimination Final at the MCG. Despite his skinny frame and inaccurate kicking at goal, he showed immense promise and started to state his claim as one of the best young key forwards in the league.

Daniher entered the 2015 AFL season as the clubs spearhead up forward, a challenging task, considering it was only his third season of senior football. Despite kicking only 34 goals for the entire season, Joe showed improvement in many key areas of his game, especially accuracy at goal, this was due to the fact that former legend Matthew Lloyd helped him with this throughout the year. He led the club's goalkicking for a second consecutive season and showed more presence on the field.

In 2016, he continued to grow as a footballer and leader, being named in the clubs leadership group and finished the season with a career-high in marks (141) and goals (43). He won the club goalkicking award for a third consecutive year and was joint runner-up with James Kelly in the W.S. Crichton Medal.

He started the 2017 AFL season, reaching his potential as one of the best forwards in the league, winning both the Anzac Day Medal and the inaugural Tom Wills Medal in the Country Game against . He finished as the club's leading goalkicker for a fourth straight season, he received his debut All-Australian Team selection and won his first W. S. Crichton Medal.

Daniher started the 2018 AFL season substantially worse than the previous year averaging less than a goal a game and having an overall lesser impact on the competition. After round 7, scans revealed early onset of osteitis pubis causing Daniher to miss the rest of the season.

After a strong pre-season, Daniher looked set for a big 2019 season; however, a mysterious calf injury sustained in training meant he would miss the first four rounds of the 2019 AFL season. Despite not being named for round 5, Daniher had been given a late call-up for the Bombers in round 5 on Good Friday against the Kangaroos. As Daniher was not named on Essendon's initial list for the round, the Bombers incurred a fine; however, Daniher proved his worth by kicking 2 goals, including one from over 55 metres out. After four matches, Daniher was ruled out for the remainder of 2019 due to a groin injury. Toward the conclusion of the season, Daniher requested a trade to Sydney, but as Sydney could not satisfy Essendon's trade request, Daniher remained at Essendon for the 2020 season.

Brisbane Lions (2021–present)
Daniher made his debut for the Brisbane Lions against  at the Gabba in round 1, 2021. He kicked two goals, but attracted criticism from former  player Kane Cornes for his jumper-grabbing celebration after kicking the first of those goals, which put the Lions out to an 18-point lead in a match they would ultimately lose by 31 points.

Daniher became the only player to kick at least one goal every game for the 2021 season, however, he fell away during their finals campaign and kicked one goal from two games.

In Brisbane's 2022 Elimination Final against Richmond, Daniher kicked the winning goal in the dying stages of the match to give the Lions a two-point win, defeating the Tigers 106-104.

Statistics
Updated to the end of the 2022 season.

|-
| 2013 ||  || 6 |
| 5 || 3 || 9 || 36 || 25 || 61 || 27 || 3 || 3 || 0.6 || 1.8 || 7.2 || 5.0 || 12.2 || 5.4 || 0.6 || 0.6 || 0
|-
| 2014 ||  || 6
| 21 || 28 || 20 || 159 || 78 || 237 || 112 || 28 || 53 || 1.3 || 1.0 || 7.6 || 3.7 || 11.3 || 5.3 || 1.3 || 2.5 || 1
|-
| 2015 ||  || 6
| 22 || 34 || 24 || 147 || 81 || 228 || 111 || 35 || 43 || 1.6 || 1.1 || 6.7 || 3.7 || 10.4 || 5.0 || 1.6 || 2.0 || 5
|- 
| 2016 ||  || 6
| 22 || 43 || 32 || 204 || 86 || 290 || 141 || 21 || 35 || 2.0 || 1.4 || 9.3 || 3.9 || 13.2 || 6.4 || 1.0 || 1.6 || 4
|-
| 2017 ||  || 6
| 23 || 65 || 39 || 249 || 103 || 352 || 153 || 31 || 78 || 2.8 || 1.7 || 10.8 || 4.5 || 15.3 || 6.6 || 1.4 || 3.4 || 9
|- 
| 2018 ||  || 6
| 7 || 8 || 9 || 73 || 24 || 97 || 39 || 9 || 9 || 1.1 || 1.3 || 10.4 || 3.4 || 13.9 || 5.6 || 1.3 || 1.3 || 0
|-
| 2019 ||  || 6
| 4 || 7 || 5 || 33 || 18 || 51 || 22 || 8 || 16 || 1.8 || 1.3 || 8.3 || 4.5 || 12.8 || 5.5 || 2.0 || 4.0 || 0
|- 
| 2020 ||  || 6
| 4 || 3 || 6 || 31 || 8 || 39 || 25 || 1 || 2 || 0.8 || 1.5 || 7.8 || 2.0 || 9.8 || 6.3 || 0.3 || 0.5 || 1
|-
| 2021 ||  || 3
| 24 || 46 || 32 || 259 || 83 || 342 || 117 || 25 || 49 || 1.9 || 1.3 || 10.8 || 3.5 || 14.3 || 4.9 || 1.0 || 2.0 || 4
|- 
| 2022 ||  || 3
| 19 || 39 || 24 || 158 || 50 || 208 || 82 || 12 || 4 || 2.0 || 1.2 || 8.3 || 2.6 || 10.9 || 4.3 || 0.6 || 0.2 || 0
|- class=sortbottom
! colspan=3 | Career
! 151 !! 276 !! 200 !! 1349 !! 556 !! 1905 !! 829 !! 173 !! 291 !! 1.8 !! 1.3 !! 8.9 !! 3.6 !! 12.6 !! 5.4 !! 1.1 !! 1.9 !! 24
|}

Notes

Honours and achievements
Individual
 W.S. Crichton Medal: 2017
 All-Australian team: 2017
 4× Essendon F.C. leading goalkicker: 2014, 2015, 2016, 2017
 Anzac Day Medal: 2017
 AFL Mark of the Year: 2017
 22under22 team: 2016
 AFL Rising Star nominee: 2014 (round 12)

References

External links

 
 
 

Living people
1994 births
Essendon Football Club players
Calder Cannons players
Australian rules footballers from Victoria (Australia)
All-Australians (AFL)
Crichton Medal winners
Brisbane Lions players